Find the Blackmailer is a 1943 American crime film directed by D. Ross Lederman. According to Warner Bros records the film earned $230,000 domestic and $77,000 foreign.

Plot

Cast
 Jerome Cowan as D. L. Trees
 Faye Emerson as Mona Vance
 Gene Lockhart as John M. Rhodes
 Marjorie Hoshelle as Pandora Pines
 Robert Kent as Mark Harper
 Wade Boteler as Detective Lieutenant Cramer
 John Harmon as Ray Hickey
 Bradley Page as Mitch Farrell
 Lou Lubin as Mr. Olen
 Ralph Peters as Mr. Coleman

Home media
In 2010, the film was released by Warner Archive as part of the six-film DVD-R collection Warner Bros. Horror/Mystery Double Features.

References

External links
 

1943 films
1943 crime films
American crime films
American black-and-white films
1940s English-language films
Films directed by D. Ross Lederman
Warner Bros. films
1940s American films